Dō may refer to:
 Dō (architecture)
 Dō (armour)
 Dō (martial arts)
 Dō (philosophy)